Mario Piedade Menezes (29 May 1960 – 25 June 2022), popularly known by his sobriquet Tragedy King, was an Indian actor, director, writer and prominent tiatrist. He primarily worked on the Konkani stage and was the vice president of Tiatr Academy Goa.

Early and personal life
Mario Menezes was born in the village of Chinchinim in Goa to Leopoldino and Esmeralda Menezes. He was married to Epiphania Menezes, the couple  had two daughters, Rioma and Riosha.

Career 
Menezes made his debut as a professional tiatrist in 1982. He was part of Rosario Rodrigues' troupe and was a long time member of Prince Jacob's troupe before starting out as an independent director and forming his own troupe "Menezes Theatre" in 2001. Menezes has also acted in tiatrs by directors like Roseferns, Comedian Agostinho, Jose Rod, Pascoal Rodrigues, Patrick Dourado, Ligorio Fernandes and Menino De Bandar. 

Menezes staged tiatrs in India as well as in other countries including the United Kingdom and Gulf nations like Kuwait. In 2018, he produced a tiatr with 25 children cast of leading tiatrists in Goa acting in it. Menezes prior to his death had directed nearly 50 tiatrs and performed in about 10,000 shows during his career.

Awards and honours 
Menezes won the 2014 Dalgado Konknni Akademi Annual Dalgado Cultural Award for his contribution to the development of Konkani in the Roman script. He has also been honoured as the Best Actor (1981), Best Director and Best Performance (1992), "Goa Bandh" and Best Duo with Lawry Travasso in 2002 at Kala Academy Tiatr Festival.

In 1985, Menezes was awarded the Gulab Best Actor  for "Amchem Ghor", Best Director for "He Chukik Bogsonem asa?" in 2001, for "Tiatr Somplo Cholat Ghara" in 2003, for "Tanchem Chintat Tevui Munxeam" in 2005  and Best Writer for "Sangat Ami Burguim Khonachim" in 2004 and for "Tanchem Chintat Tevui Munxean" in 2005. Menezes is also the recipient of the Dr Jack Sequeira Award for Best Director for "Kal Aiz Ani Falleam in 2009, for Beiman Kir" in 2010, for "Hatachin Panch Bottam" in 2011 and Best Tiatr for "Maim Tuka Khoim Soddum" in 2012 Best Actor for "Beiman Kir" in 2010.

He was amongst the first three in all editions of the Tiatr Academy of Goa Popular Tiatr Festival. In the first year, he won First Place for Best Actor and Best Director and second place for Script and Performance for "Beiman Kir".  In the second year, he won awards for 'Futtleli Boxi" and in the third year he won the first place for negative role in "Xirlo".

In the fourth Year of Tiatr Academy Popular Tiatr Festival, he won the first place for Writer, Director and  Performance for "Hi Vatt Khoim Veta" and the following year he won the second place for Director,  Script and Performance for "Kollxear Udok". In the sixth year of the awards, he won the second place for performance and third place for director for "Eke Fottik Xembhor Fotti". The Goa Konkani Akademi also awarded him for Best Script for Tanchem Chintat Tivui Munxeam.

Death 
Menezes died as a result of massive heart attack at Chiplun, Maharashtra, while he was en route to Mumbai. He was on his way by train along with Menino de Bandar's troupe for a tiatr performance. His funeral was attended by hundreds of fans and dignitaries.

Filmography

Tiatrs

References

External links
 Mario Menezes at Tiatr.in

1960 births
2022 deaths
Tiatrists
People from South Goa district
Goan people
Indian male actors
Goan Catholics
Indian directors
Konkani people
Dramatists and playwrights from Goa
People from Goa
21st-century Indian people